The 2008 European Tour was the 37th golf season since the European Tour officially began in 1972. 

The season began in November 2007 and consisted of 50 official money events, a drop of two from the previous year. This included seven major championships and World Golf Championships, which are also sanctioned by the PGA Tour. 27 events took place in Europe, 11 in Asia, six in the United States, four in South Africa, one in Australia and one in New Zealand.

The Order of Merit was won by Robert Karlsson, the first Swedish golfer to do so. The Golfer of the Year award was given to Pádraig Harrington, who won two major championships during the season and finished second in the Order of Merit. The Sir Henry Cotton Rookie of the Year was Pablo Larrazábal from Spain.

Major tournaments

For a summary of the major tournaments and events of 2008, including the major championships and the World Golf Championships, see 2008 in golf.

Changes for 2008
There were four new tournaments, the Indian Masters, the Ballantine's Championship in South Korea, and in Spain the Madrid Masters and the Castelló Masters Costa Azahar. Lost from the tour schedule were the Singapore Masters, the TCL Classic, the Deutsche Bank Players Championship of Europe, the Madrid Open and the Mallorca Classic. the World Match Play Championship was originally scheduled, but was not held; it returned in 2009 with a new sponsor and venue.

Schedule
The following table lists official events during the 2008 season.

Unofficial events
The following events were sanctioned by the European Tour, but did not carry official money, nor were wins official.

Location of tournaments

Order of Merit
The Order of Merit was based on prize money won during the season, calculated in Euros.

Awards

Golfer of the Month

See also
2008 in golf
2008 European Seniors Tour
2008 PGA Tour
List of golfers with most European Tour wins

Notes

References

External links
2008 season results on the PGA European Tour website
2008 Order of Merit on the PGA European Tour website

European Tour seasons
European Tour